Nienstedter Beeke is a river of Lower Saxony, Germany. It flows into the Klosterbach (the upper course of the Varreler Bäke) near Bassum.

See also
List of rivers of Lower Saxony

References

Rivers of Lower Saxony
Rivers of Germany